Hypsopygia fulvocilialis is a moth of the  family Pyralidae. It is found in Southern Europe, as far north as Hungary. It used to be (and sometimes still is) placed in the genus Herculia.

The moth flies from May to September depending on the location.

External links
BioLib
GlobiZ
Fauna Europaea

Moths described in 1834
Pyralini
Moths of Europe
Taxa named by Philogène Auguste Joseph Duponchel